Hybrid fiber-coaxial (HFC) is a telecommunications industry term for a broadband network that combines optical fiber and coaxial cable. It has been commonly employed globally by cable television operators since the early 1990s.

In a hybrid fiber-coaxial cable system, the television channels are sent from the cable system's distribution facility, the headend, to local communities through optical fiber subscriber lines.  At the local community, a box called an optical node translates the signal from a light beam to radio frequency (RF), and sends it over coaxial cable lines for distribution to subscriber residences.  The fiberoptic trunk lines provide adequate bandwidth to allow future expansion and new bandwidth-intensive services  such as cable internet access through DOCSIS.

Description

The fiber optic network extends from the cable operators' master headend, sometimes to regional headends, and out to a neighborhood's hubsite, and finally to an optical to coaxial cable node which serves anywhere from 25 to 2000 homes. A master headend will usually have satellite dishes for reception of distant video signals as well as IP aggregation routers. Some master headends also house telephony equipment (such as automatic telephone exchanges) for providing telecommunications services to the community.

A regional or area headend/hub will receive the video signal from the master headend and add to it the public, educational, and government access (PEG) cable TV channels as required by local franchising authorities or insert targeted advertising that would appeal to a local area. The various services are encoded, modulated and upconverted onto RF carriers, combined onto a single electrical signal and inserted into a broadband optical transmitter which in practice is a transmitter module in an "optics platform" or headend platform such as an Arris CH3000.

This optical transmitter converts the electrical signal to a downstream optically modulated signal that is sent to the nodes. Fiber optic cables connect the headend or hub to the optical nodes in a point-to-point or star topology, or in some cases, in a protected ring topology.

Fiber optic nodes 
A fiber optic node has a broadband optical receiver, which converts the downstream optically modulated signal coming from the headend or hub to an electrical signal going to the customers.  the downstream signal is a RF modulated signal that typically begins at 50 MHz and ranges from 550 to 1000 MHz on the upper end. The fiber optic node also contains a reverse- or return-path transmitter that sends communication from customers back to the headend. In North America, this reverse signal is a modulated RF ranging from 5–42 MHz while in other parts of the world, the range is 5–65 MHz. This electrical signal is then outputted through coaxial cable to form a coaxial trunk.

The optical portion of the network provides a large amount of flexibility. If there are not many fiber-optic cables to the node, wavelength division multiplexing can be used to combine multiple optical signals onto the same fiber. Optical filters are used to combine and split optical wavelengths onto the single fiber. For example, the downstream signal could be on a wavelength at 1490 nm and the return signal could be on a wavelength at 1310 nm.

Final connection to customers 
The coaxial trunk portion of the network connects 25–2000 homes (500 is typical) in a tree-and-branch configuration off of the node. RF amplifiers are used at intervals to overcome cable attenuation and passive losses of the electrical signals caused by splitting or "tapping" the coaxial cable.

Trunk coaxial cables are connected to the optical node and form a coaxial backbone to which smaller distribution cables connect. Trunk cables also carry AC power which is added to the cable line at usually either 60 or 90 V by a power supply (with a lead acid backup battery inside) and a power inserter. The power is added to the cable line so that optical nodes, trunk and distribution amplifiers do not need an individual, external power source. The power supply might have a power meter next to it depending on local power company regulations. Trunk cables may have trunk amplifiers.

From the trunk cables, smaller distribution cables are connected to a port of the trunk amplifier to carry the RF signal and the AC power down individual streets. If needed, line extenders, which are smaller distribution amplifiers, boost the signals to keep the power of the television signal at a level that the TV can accept. The distribution line is then "tapped" into and used to connect the individual drops to customer homes.

These taps pass the RF signal and block the AC power unless there are telephony devices that need the back-up power reliability provided by the coax power system. The tap terminates into a small coaxial drop using a standard screw type connector known as an F connector.

The drop is then connected to the house where a ground block protects the system from stray voltages. Depending on the design of the network, the signal can then be passed through a splitter to multiple TVs or to multiple set top boxes (cable boxes) which may then be connected to a TV. If too many splitters are used to connect multiple TVs, the signal levels will decrease, and picture quality on analog channels will decrease. The signal in TVs past those splitters will lose quality and require the use of a "drop" or "house" amplifier to restore the signal.

Transport over HFC network
By using frequency-division multiplexing, a HFC network may carry a variety of services, including analog TV, digital TV (SDTV or HDTV), video on demand, telephony, and internet traffic. Services on these systems are carried on RF signals in the 5 MHz to 1000 MHz frequency band.

The HFC network is typically operated bi-directionally, meaning that signals are carried in both directions on the same network from the headend/hub office to the home, and from the home to the headend/hub office. The forward-path or downstream signals carry information from the headend/hub office to the home, such as video content, voice and Internet traffic. The very first HFC networks, and very old unupgraded HFC networks, are only one-way systems. Equipment for one-way systems may use POTS or radio networks to communicate to the headend.

The return-path or upstream signals carry information from the home to the headend/hub office, such as control signals to order a movie or internet upstream traffic. The forward-path and the return-path are carried over the same coaxial cable in both directions between the optical node and the home.

To prevent interference of signals, the frequency band is divided into two sections. In countries that have traditionally used NTSC System M, the sections are 52–1000 MHz for forward-path signals, and 5–42 MHz for return-path signals. Other countries use different band sizes, but are similar in that there is much more bandwidth for downstream communication than for upstream communication.

Traditionally, since video content was sent only to the home, the HFC network was structured to be asymmetrical: one direction has much more data-carrying capacity than the other direction. The return path was originally only used for some control signals to order movies, etc., which required very little bandwidth. As additional services have been added to the HFC network, such as Internet access and telephony, the return path is being utilised more.

Multiple-system operators 

Multi-system operators (MSOs) developed methods of sending the various services over RF signals on the fiber optic and coaxial copper cables. The original method to transport video over the HFC network and, still the most widely used method, is by modulation of standard analog TV channels which is similar to the method used for transmission of over-the-air broadcast.

One analog TV channel occupies a 6-MHz-wide frequency band in NTSC-based systems, or an 8-MHz-wide frequency band in PAL or SECAM-based systems. Each channel is centred on a specific frequency carrier so that there is no interference with adjacent or harmonic channels. To be able to view a digitally modulated channel, home, or customer-premises equipment (CPE), e.g. digital televisions, computers, or set-top boxes, are required to convert the RF signals to signals that are compatible with display devices such as analog televisions or computer monitors. The US Federal Communications Commission (FCC) has ruled that consumers can obtain a cable card from their local MSO to authorize viewing digital channels.

By using digital video compression techniques, multiple standard and high-definition TV channels can be carried on one 6 or 8 MHz frequency carrier, thus increasing the channel carrying capacity of the HFC network by 10 times or more versus an all-analog network.

Comparison to competing network technologies
Digital subscriber line (DSL) is a technology used by traditional telephone companies to deliver advanced services (high-speed data and sometimes video) over twisted pair copper telephone wires. It typically has lower data carrying capacity than HFC networks and data speeds can be range-limited by line lengths and quality.

Satellite television competes very well with HFC networks in delivering broadcast video services. Interactive satellite systems are less competitive in urban environments because of their large round-trip delay times, but are attractive in rural areas and other environments with insufficient or no deployed terrestrial infrastructure.

Analogous to HFC, fiber in the loop (FITL) technology is used by telephone local exchange carriers to provide advanced services to telephone customers over the plain old telephone service (POTS) local loop.

In the 2000s, telecom companies started significant deployments of fiber to the x (FTTX) such as passive optical network solutions to deliver video, data and voice to compete with cable operators. These can be costly to deploy but they can provide large bandwidth capacity especially for data services.

See also

 Access network
 Backbone network
 Cable modem
 Cable modem termination system (CMTS)
 DOCSIS
 FTTLA
 Multimedia over Coax Alliance
 National Cable & Telecommunications Association (NCTA – US)
 Network service provider
 Radio frequency over glass (RFoG)
 Quadrature amplitude modulation
 MPEG-2
 Society of Cable Television Engineers (SCTE – US)

References

External links 
 Information on HFC networks in Australia

Broadband
Fiber-optic communications
Digital cable